Chrysaora colorata (Russell), commonly known as the purple-striped jelly, is a species of jellyfish that exists primarily off the coast of California from Bodega Bay to San Diego. The tentacles vary with the age of the individual, consisting typically of eight marginal long dark arms, and four central frilly oral arms. It is closely studied by scientists due to not much being known about their eating habits.

Often young Cancer crabs make home in the jellyfish and eat the parasitic amphipods that feed on and damage the jellyfish. The chrysaora colorata are more active in a lively current which makes it easier for them to move to capture their prey.

Description 
The purple striped jelly is also known as the purple-striped sea nettle. When it is extremely young, it has a pinkish color and its tentacles are long and dark maroon. At the adult stage the dark maroon color of the tentacles starts to fade and the purple appears as stripes on the bell. At a young age the adults' four frilly oral arms will become longer. When the jellyfish starts to get older the tentacles thicken and the purple stripes start to darken and the tentacles start to look pale, its oral arms like to disappear.  They are known to feed on a variety of organisms including Cladocera, Appendicularia, Copepoda, Hydromedusae, Siphonophora, and fish eggs. When the prey touches a marginal tentacle, stingers are immediately discharged to paralyze prey and marginal tentacle bends inward to the nearest oral arm. The oral arm is used to transport prey to the gastrovascular cavity (GVC) and to catch motionless prey.
The sting of this jellyfish is extremely painful to humans but is rare.

Diet 

Its diet consists of zooplankton, including copepods, larval fish, ctenophores, salps, other jellies, and fish eggs.

Predation 
The C. colorata is primarily preyed upon by leatherback turtles. They are selected as prey due to the high concentrations of carbon and nitrogen in their four oral arms. They are particularly nutrient-dense during the post-upwelling season, which is when the leatherback concentration in the area is at its highest.

References

External links
 

Chrysaora
Animals described in 1964